"My Name Is Jack" is a song written by American record producer John Simon and released as a single by British group Manfred Mann in 1968. Their version reached number 8 on the UK Singles Chart. It became an international Top 10 hit, but only reached number 104 in the US.

Background
The lyrics and music were written by John Simon, and his own version was included on the soundtrack of the 1968 film You Are What You Eat.  The song tells the story of a resident of the "Greta Garbo Home for Wayward Boys and Girls", which was the nickname of a real hostel, the Kirkland Hotel, in San Francisco, where part of the movie was filmed. Formerly the Kashu Hotel, the building became dilapidated and was demolished, and the Christ United Presbyterian Church was opened on the site in 1975.

The song was recorded at one of the first high-profile sessions at the newly constructed Trident Studios in London, which would later become renowned for its use by such artists as the Beatles, David Bowie, Queen, and others.

Personnel
Mike d'Abo – vocals, piano
Manfred Mann – keyboards
Tom McGuinness – guitar
Klaus Voormann – bass guitar
Mike Hugg – drums

Chart history

Cover versions
 1978 – Moonriders, Nouvelles Vagues
 1994 – Pizzicato Five, Great White Wonder

References

1968 singles
1968 songs
Manfred Mann songs
Fontana Records singles
British pop rock songs
Psychedelic pop songs